The Wensleydale is a British breed of domestic sheep. It is named for the Wensleydale region of North Yorkshire, in the north of England, where it was bred in the early nineteenth century by cross-breeding a Dishley Leicester ram with local long-woolled sheep of a breed that is now extinct. It has a blue-grey face and long purled wool, and is among the heaviest of British sheep breeds. It is an endangered breed, and is categorised as "at risk" by the Rare Breeds Survival Trust. It is often used as a ram breed to cross with other breeds to obtain market lambs, and for its high-quality wool.

History 

The mating of a Leicester ram with a Teeswater ewe in 1838 made the famous ram 'BLUE CAP' who was the first sire of the Wensleydale breed.

Today this breed is established throughout the United Kingdom and extends into mainland Europe, this breed is also being established in the United States of America.

The Wensleydale contributed to the development of the Blue-faced Leicester.

Characteristics 

... grey black face, ears and legs. The ears are slightly elongated and stand upright.
They are naturally polled and have a tuft of long wool on top of the head which is not typically shorn (for aesthetic purposes).The wool that falls between the ears and across the face is known as the topping.

References

External links

 The Wensleydale Longwool Sheep Breeders Association founded in 1890
 North American Wensleydale Sheep Association
Images

Sheep breeds
Sheep breeds originating in England
Animal breeds on the RBST Watchlist
Wensleydale